The 2019 Western Cape provincial election was held on 8 May 2019 to elect the 6th Western Cape Provincial Parliament. It was the sixth provincial election held since the establishment of the provincial legislature in 1994.

Incumbent Premier Helen Zille of the Democratic Alliance (DA) was term-limited and could not seek re-election to a third term. The party nominated Alan Winde to succeed her.

The provincial election was won by the ruling Democratic Alliance (DA), but with a reduced majority of 55.45%, down from 59.38% in the 2014 election. The party lost two seats and achieved a majority of 24 seats in the legislature.  The Official Opposition African National Congress (ANC) declined from 32.89% to 28.64%, and also lost two seats. The Economic Freedom Fighters (EFF) significantly grew, going from 2.11% to 4.04%, and, consequently, gained one seat. The newly-formed Good received 3.11% of the vote and won a seat. The African Christian Democratic Party (ACDP) grew to 2.66% and retained its sole seat. The Freedom Front Plus (FF+) and Al Jama-ah also won one seat each.

Background
The 2014 provincial election resulted in the continuation of the incumbent Democratic Alliance provincial government headed by Helen Zille. This would be Zille's second and final term as Premier of the Western Cape. The party increased its seat total from 22 to 26 seats. The African National Congress with Marius Fransman remained the Official Opposition with 14 seats. The newly-formed Economic Freedom Fighters became the third largest party with only one seat. The African Christian Democratic Party retained its sole seat.

On 18 April 2015, incumbent Democratic Alliance Provincial Leader Ivan Meyer announced that he would not seek re-election. Mayor of Cape Town Patricia de Lille was elected as his successor.

In January 2016, allegations of sexual harassment were made against African National Congress Provincial Chairperson Marius Fransman by his former assistant, Louisa Wynand. The party named Khaya Magaxa as his acting successor. Fransman was suspended as Provincial Chairperson in February 2016, and expelled from the African National Congress in November 2016.

In February 2017, Patricia de Lille resigned as Provincial Leader of the Democratic Alliance in order to focus on her mayorship.  Deputy Provincial Leader Bonginkosi Madikizela was designated as the interim leader of the party. Madikizela was later elected to a full term in October 2017.

Throughout 2017 and 2018, the Democratic Alliance accused Patricia de Lille of maladministration and covering up corruption in the City of Cape Town. She strongly denied these allegations.

In April 2018, former Western Cape Premier Ebrahim Rasool was announced as the head of the ANC’s Western Cape elections campaign.

In August 2018, Patricia de Lille announced that she would resign as Mayor of Cape Town, effective on 31 October 2018.

In September 2018, The Democratic Alliance selected Alan Winde as the party's Western Cape Premier candidate.

In October 2018, Patricia de Lille resigned as both Mayor of Cape Town and member of the Democratic Alliance. She was succeeded by her predecessor, Dan Plato. She subsequently founded a new political party named Good in December 2018. The party contested the 2019 elections both nationally and provincially.

On 6 November 2018, former Provincial Minister of Community Safety Dan Plato was elected Mayor of Cape Town on 6 November 2018 during a special council sitting, receiving 146 out of 202 valid votes. Six ballots were spoilt. The vote was held via secret ballot. His main challengers were Xolani Sotashe from the African National Congress and Grant Haskin from the African Christian Democratic Party. Sotashe received 53 votes while Haskin got 3 votes.

On 22 January 2019, the Freedom Front Plus announced that it had selected former Premier of the Western Cape and Mayor of Cape Town, Peter Marais, as its party premier candidate.

Contesting parties and premier candidates
This is a list of political parties that the IEC presented on 20 March 2019 in the order that they appeared on the provincial ballot:

Democratic Alliance
On 1 July 2018, the Democratic Alliance announced its list of candidates nominated for the position of premier. These candidates included:
Fazloodien Abrahams, an attorney from Mitchells Plain
Bonginkosi Madikizela, Democratic Alliance Provincial Leader, Provincial Minister of Human Settlements, Member of the Western Cape Provincial Parliament and former Provincial Minister of Housing
David Maynier, Shadow Minister of Finance and Member of the National Assembly
Kelly Baloyi, a student with a degree in political science
Jacobus MacFarlane, an LL.B. law student, politician, businessman and human rights activist
Alan Winde, Provincial Minister of Economic Opportunities, Member of the Western Cape Provincial Parliament and former Provincial Minister of Finance, Economic Development and Tourism 
Micheal Mack

On 19 September 2018, Democratic Alliance  National Leader Mmusi Maimane announced Alan Winde as the party's premier candidate.

African National Congress
By January 2019, the provincial African National Congress had not announced its premier candidate or the list of candidates running to replace acting chairperson Khaya Magaxa. Here are a few candidates that were speculated to be contenders for both the positions of Provincial Chairperson and premier candidate:
Ebrahim Rasool, Western Cape ANC Head of Elections, former South African Ambassador to the United States and former Premier of the Western Cape
Cameron Dugmore, Member of the Western Cape Provincial Parliament, former Provincial Minister of Cultural Affairs and Sport and former Provincial Minister of Education
Bongani Mkongi, Deputy Minister of Police and Member of the National Assembly of South Africa
Pat Lekker, Member of the Western Cape Provincial Parliament

On 18 March 2019, the party's leadership announced that its provincial elective conference would be held after the 2019 elections. Provincial-Secretary Faiez Jacobs and acting Provincial Chairperson Khaya Magaxa both declared that they would not contest the elective conference.

On 25 April 2019, ANC Provincial Elections Head Ebrahim Rasool announced that the party would not field a premier candidate over concerns that it would divide the provincial party.

Soon after the provincial election, the African National Congress announced Cameron Dugmore as the Leader of the Opposition in the Western Cape Provincial Parliament and subsequent premier candidate. Dugmore lost to Alan Winde of the Democratic Alliance on 22 May 2019.

Economic Freedom Fighters
The Economic Freedom Fighters Leader Julius Malema announced on 2 February 2019 that the party would not field any premier candidates. City of Cape Town councillor Melikhaya Xego is the party's provincial chairperson. He was also first on the party's provincial parliament list.

African Christian Democratic Party
Ferlon Christians, Member of the Western Cape Provincial Parliament and 2014 ACDP Western Cape Premier candidate
In February 2019, the party selected Christians as its premier candidate.

Freedom Front Plus
Peter Marais, former Mayor of Cape Town and former Premier of the Western Cape
On 22 January 2019, the party announced that it had nominated Marais as its premier candidate.

Good
Patricia de Lille, Leader of Good, former Mayor of Cape Town, former Provincial Leader of the Western Cape Democratic Alliance and former Leader of the Independent Democrats

On 10 February 2019, the party announced that it had nominated De Lille as its Western Cape Premier candidate.

Land Party
Loyiso Nkohla, former African National Congress City of Cape Town councillor

On 26 February 2019, the Land Party selected Nkohla as the party's premier candidate.

Opinion polling

Footnotes

Results

References

2019 elections in South Africa
Western Cape provincial election
Elections in the Western Cape